House of Memsie (also known as Mesmie House) is a Category A listed country house and estate in Memsie, Aberdeenshire, Scotland. It dates to around 1760, and it received its historic designation in 1971. It was formerly the home of the Fraser family for over three hundred years. It was sold to Lord Saltoun in the early 19th century. A Captain Dalrymple was another previous owner. Historian Charles McKean describes it as a "smaller and more decorative version of Aberdour House".

Gallery

See also
List of listed buildings in Aberdeenshire

References

External links
 Interior plan and interior and exterior photos of the property - Savills

Category A listed buildings in Aberdeenshire
Buildings and structures in Aberdeenshire
Country houses in Aberdeenshire